Zabak is a 1961 Hindi/Urdu action costume drama film produced and directed by Homi Wadia for his Basant Pictures under the Wadia Productions banner. The story and dialogue were by C. L. Cavish, with screenplay by JBH Wadia. The music composer was Chitragupta, with lyrics by Prem Dhawan. The cast of the film included Shyama, Mahipal, Sahira, Achala Sachdev, Manhar Desai, Muzaffar Adeeb and Krishna Kumari.

The film was a costume drama about a middle-class man in love with a princess. He joins the dacoits to avenge his father's death.

This film was remade in Tamil with the title Arabu Naattu Azhagi. Music was composed by Vijayabaskar.

Plot
Hajji (Mahipal) is a carefree young man in love with the princess Zainab (Shyama). His father is a middle-class man who runs a Hamam (Bath house). He is not happy with his son's relationship with the princess because of their social inequality. The minister Qasim Beg has Hajji and his father arrested. The father's hair is shaven off as punishment while Zabak is whipped. The father, out of shame for his situation, commits suicide. Zabak is thrown out of the city gates, where he saves Saudagar (merchant) Usman Shah's daughter from being kidnapped. Usman Shah (B. M. Vyas), though posing as a merchant, turns out to be a dacoit. Hajji, now Zabak, joins the dacoits, albeit unwillingly. When Usman plans to attack and loot Zabak's home town Isbahan, he goes along as he finds out that Qasim Beg will marry Zainab. During the dacoity, Zainab is abducted by one of Usman's men. Qasim, who was in a fight with Zabak and left for dead, kills the Sultan and takes his place. Zabak goes through being misunderstood by his beloved and his mother, but with help from his friends, he succeeds in righting all the wrongs committed by Qasim and marries the princess.

Cast
 Shyama as Zainab
 Mahipal as Zabak/Hajji
 Sahira as Samina
 Krishna Kumari as Salma
 Achala Sachdev as Zabak's mother
 Manhar Desai  
 Adeeb
 W. M. Khan
 B. M. Vyas as Usman Shah/dacoit
 Babu Raje
 Uma Dutt
 Sardar Mansoor
 Mithoo Miyan

Music
Prem Dhawan write all the songs and Chitragupt composed them. "Teri Duniya Se Door"  became a successful song for Mohammed Rafi and Lata Mangeshkar who gave playback for the actors in the film. The singers included Geeta Dutt, Lata Mangeshkar, Mahendra Kapoor, Mohammed Rafi, Mukesh and Balbir.

Songlist

References

External links

1961 films
1960s Hindi-language films
Films directed by Homi Wadia
Films scored by Chitragupta
Hindi films remade in other languages
1960s Urdu-language films
Urdu-language Indian films
Urdu films remade in other languages
Indian historical drama films
Indian historical action films
1950s historical drama films
1950s historical action films